Jay Kay (born Jason Luís Cheetham; 30 December 1969) is a British funk and alternative rock singer-songwriter. He is best known as the co-founder and lead vocalist of the acid jazz and funk band Jamiroquai, which was formed in 1992.

Early life 
Jay Kay was born Jason Luís Cheetham in Blackburn on 30 December 1969, the son of English cabaret singer Karen Kay and Portuguese guitarist Luís Saraiva. He did not meet his biological father until 2001. Kay's identical twin, David, died a few weeks after the two were born. Kay said in a 2010 interview that his mother raised him largely alone, which gave him "an itinerant childhood", half of which he spent "living in rural Suffolk and rural Devon". According to a 1997 article in the Lancashire Evening Telegraph, he moved to Manchester with his mother and step-father Mervyn Kay as a youngster from Blackburn. He often accompanied his mother at her performances, and later attended Oakham School in Oakham. At the age of 15, he was homeless and turned to small crimes to survive; he returned home after a false arrest and near-death experience, working as a break-dancer and soon pursuing a career in music. It was widely reported that he failed an audition to become a singer for the Brand New Heavies prior to forming his own band, though the Brand New Heavies denied the claim.

Career

Jamiroquai 
Kay formed Jamiroquai in 1992. Band members included Toby Smith (keyboards), Nick Van Gelder (drums, 1992–1993), Derrick McKenzie (drums 1994–present) and Wallis Buchanan (didgeridoo). After the success of Jamiroquai's first single, "When You Gonna Learn", Kay signed a US$1 million record deal with Sony Soho2. The band's first album was Emergency on Planet Earth. The relationship with Sony ended in 2007. The band has sold more than 26 million albums worldwide. Kay is occasionally referred to as 'Jamiroquai' due to the misconception that the band is a solo artist.

Kay is well known for his array of elaborate hats and headgear. Professional appearances for concerts, interviews and the like have prompted descriptions of Kay as "the mad hatter" for his love of headgear. In 2005, it was announced that Kay, often referred to as "the cat in the hat", was launching a range of distinctive clothing, including his trademark hats, on his new "Quai" label. The Indian Country Media Network criticised him for wearing headresses orinating from Native American populations, including the feathered war bonnet (as seen in the music video and CD single artwork for "Corner of the Earth" as well as on the album artwork for 2010's Rock Dust Light Star).

On 9 October 2017, Kay received the BMI President's Award at the BMI London Awards. That same year, he seriously injured his spine. Requiring surgery, it led to Jamiroquai cancelling two shows in Tokyo for their Automaton Tour, which were rescheduled later that year.

TV appearances
Kay appeared in an episode of the BBC series The Naked Chef with chef Jamie Oliver, and he performed on the series Strictly Come Dancing singing "Canned Heat". 
He has made many other TV guest appearances as either a singer, interviewee, or both, including on The Word, The Girlie Show, The Tonight Show with Jay Leno, Friday Night with Jonathan Ross, Rove, and many others. 

Kay has appeared on four episodes of the BBC car show Top Gear. In series 1, episode 2, he set a lap time of 1:48.1 for the show's "Star in a Reasonably Priced Car" using the Suzuki Liana, holding the fastest lap time for all of the first series and most of the second series. In series 3, episode 4, Kay drove his Lamborghini Miura with Richard Hammond as a passenger. His third appearance was in series 11, episode 6, where his lap time of 1:45.81 using the Chevrolet Lacetti beat the top time held by Simon Cowell by one-tenth of a second; this car's record remained unbeaten throughout the entire series' run despite there being 58 drivers in total for the Chevrolet Lacetti, with AC/DC's Brian Johnson coming in second place for this car with 1:45.85. Kay won Top Gear's "John Sergeant Award" for the best dance after learning that his time on the Top Gear test track was the fastest lap time in 2008. On 24 May 2004, Kay appeared on Season 5, Episode 9 of Channel 5 series Fifth Gear. He gave the presenters a tour around his property whilst showing off his collection of cars.

Legal issues
In April 2001, Kay was charged with assaulting a photographer and damaging his camera outside the Attica nightclub in London's West End. Kay pleaded not guilty, and the charges were dropped due to lack of evidence.

In May 2002, Kay was questioned by police after an altercation at a premiere party for Star Wars: Episode II – Attack of the Clones, outside the St Martin's Lane Hotel, where it was alleged a photographer kicked his £70,000 Bentley after Kay had attempted to grab him as his car drove off. Kay harangued the photographer and his girlfriend, causing the man to give him a severe headbutt. The pair were separated with blood streaming from Kay's nose. The fight almost resumed inside the hotel, and Kay was photographed in a distressed state. He sported a black eye at his next gig.

In March 2009, Kay's black Ferrari Enzo suffered nearly £10,000 worth of damage during an altercation with hotel chef Aaron Billington at the Brudenell Hotel in Aldeburgh. Billington, who was drunk and motivated by romantic interest in a woman with whom Kay was interacting, lost his job and was jailed for 20 weeks.

Wealth

Kay appeared on the 2004 Sunday Times Rich List in joint 950th place. The 2008 Sunday Times Rich List ranked him at No. 1,794, with £40 million. As of 2021, his personal wealth is estimated to be around £51 million.

By 2013, Kay had owned hundreds of cars—mainly sports cars. The cover of Travelling Without Moving features an adaptation of the "Buffalo Man" logo and the Ferrari crest. Some press coverage has negatively contrasted his strong interest in exotic cars with themes of environmental concern in Jamiroquai's lyrics. He responded in an interview, "[People] keep talking to me about cars and environment, and I reckon I do about 3,000 miles a year [...] I don't really drive that much at all any more, because I'm either on tour or doing stuff."

Three of Kay's cars appeared in the video for the song "Cosmic Girl". One of the cars was totalled, and the replacement was involved in an incident that destroyed the windscreen. Kay was not involved in either incident. In 2011, he visited Maranello for an exclusive viewing of the new Ferrari 458 Spider. Amongst his car collection, including what he calls "staff cars", he owned a one-off 1965 Ferrari 330 GT Vignale Shooting Brake. He decided to auction this car off in 2018, selling it to a man in Ohio for $313,000.

The song "Black Devil Car" from the album Dynamite is a tribute to his black Ferrari Enzo. A die-cast 1:18 scale-model series of Kay's black Enzo from Hot Wheels was available for purchase, including a limited batch of cars with hand-signed windscreens.

Kay competed in the Celebrity Challenge race at the 2012 Silverstone Classic, finishing third behind AC/DC vocalist Brian Johnson and actor Kelvin Fletcher.

At the 2014 Goodwood Festival of Speed, Kay showcased his signal green LaFerrari, the only one of its colour in the world. He sold the car in 2019.

Personal life
Kay began dating actress Denise van Outen in 1998. They were engaged and reportedly on the verge of marriage, but split up in 2001. He and his current wife, Maria, have two daughters named Carla and Tallulah. The track "Carla" from the Automaton album is a tribute to his first daughter. There is also a track called "Talullah" from Jamiroquai's 2005 album Dynamite, although the spelling on the album is different to his daughter's name.

Kay stated in 2010 that he had a "substantial" cocaine habit before quitting his drug use in 2003.

Kay formerly lived in the Ealing area of London, where he played some of his first gigs. He now lives in Horsenden, where he has a private studio.

When asked in a 1996 interview about having conventional religious beliefs, Kay responded, "I follow the religion of the trees and the greenery. I follow the religion of the moon. I believe in what people leave behind in the sense of trails and spirits, the energy which they project. I believe in vibrations, which is what the whole world runs on."

See also
 List of number-one dance hits (United States)
 List of artists who reached number one on the US Dance chart

References

External links
 
 

1969 births
Living people
Acid jazz musicians
English funk musicians
British car collectors
English people of Portuguese descent
British contemporary R&B singers
English male singer-songwriters
English record producers
English soul singers
Grammy Award winners
Ivor Novello Award winners
Jamiroquai members
People educated at Oakham School
People from Stretford
English twins
Alumni of the University of West London
Musicians from Greater Manchester